Lion is the fifth album by American musician, comedian, and actor Stephen Lynch, released in 2012. The first half of the album was recorded at Studio G! (Nashville, Tennessee) and the second half of the album was recorded live from Symphony Space (New York City).

Lynch told interviewer Dylan Gadino, "I wanted this album to have the Americana flavor to it that I love so much in the music of, say, Neil Young or Patty Griffin or Ray LaMontagne. I think it does... And, I'm confident the songs are still funny, if a bit subtler than some of my earlier work. Astute listeners will detect a slight shift of direction, comedy-wise. Musically, it's the best work I've ever done. I'm a little bit in love with it."

Background 
Lynch told interviewer John Liberty, an online journalist, that he was "riding his bicycle while listening to his iPod on shuffle when it randomly selected an old mix from his last studio album." Lynch told Mr. Liberty, "I realized how much I didn't like it." Therefore, he "set out to create a musically satisfying album first. The jokes came second." Lynch added, "Really, I just wanted to make a great record of music you could listen to without paying attention to the words... I threw a lot away. I wasn't going to settle for something just because it was funny. I wanted it to resonate with me."

Lynch's lyrical reputation 
Lynch's reputation for his song-writing is part of the background for this album; this reputation is widely known, and his sort of comedy is widely expected, among fans and reviewers.

Reviewer Nick A. Zaino III wrote: "Lynch has always reveled in that contrast between sweet music and scatological content."  John Seaborn Gray, likewise, said in a review of a 2009 concert, "Lynch's songs certainly help to establish the tone. Beautifully written, the clash between the coarse, often shocking subject matter with the serene and lovely music lends a spirit of playful anarchy to the show. Nothing is sacred, and nothing is to be taken too seriously." Gray added, "It is the talent of a veteran comic to chastise his audience and make them happy for it. No matter how many unruly, drunken fans shouted for their favorite songs, Lynch was able to head them off with ... a short, sharp retort ("I am not a jukebox, assholes!") without seeming resentful..."

Grant V. Ziegler, Editor-in-Chief of The North Lake College News-Register, gives another sample of Lynch's combined notoriety and prestige: "Envision two beautiful angels coming down from heaven and having the prettiest voices you've ever heard. But instead of them speaking softly to you with encouraging words they fill your ears with obscenities while singing about the most offensive topics known to humankind." He adds that Lynch is a "self-proclaimed 'musician trapped in the body of a comedian'." Ziegler writes, ruefully, in a review of a March, 2013 concert: "Unfortunately, most of the audience was only familiar with Lynch's older material..."

Music and lyrics 
Half of the album was recorded in studio, and the other half performed live. Nick Zaino writes that, on Lion, Lynch "offers both studio and live versions of 13 tracks and takes the musical side of musical comedy a step further, making it an equal partner with the comedy. Fans of Americana and acoustic musical could listen to the studio half of Lion and hear a delicate, finely produced album. That is, if they could ignore the lyrics about Juggalos, queer tattoos and a monumental case of whiskey dick."

Lynch told Mr. Liberty, "In general, the album is a little less frenetic, it's softer. More thoughtful. There are more spaces between the jokes..." Many of the songs are almost ballad-like, in comparison with older, more rocking songs such as "Craig" and "Kitten".

For some of the change in the sound of the music, Zaino credits Lynch's working with guitarist and Nashville producer Doug Lancio (who has collaborated with Patty Griffin, Steve Earle and John Hiatt).

About the B side recorded live, Zaino said, "The live disc sparkles musically as well, proving the smooth sound isn't just studio trickery. Lynch, Jaye and a few backing musicians change the arrangements slightly from the studio versions."

"Tattoo" 
In a review of a March, 2013 concert, Grant Ziegler wrote that the song might become "a new fan favorite." Of the crowd's response, he said, "It directly offended nearly half of the audience, as it was about the horrible tattoos people get nowadays. From attacking Japanese typography, tribal marks, lower back tattoos and any other generic overused logo, this song systematically offended just about everyone's body art. This was the first song of the night where Courtney Jaye joined in and immediately the audience could recognize the chemistry between her and Lynch. Their duets were nearly perfect, aside from one or two minor lyrical flubs. But never before has anyone heard such beautiful voices sing such vile material together."

"Lorelei" 
Reviewer Nick Zaino wrote that Lynch "isn't afraid to write a beautiful number like Lorelei, one that wouldn't sound out of place next to Emmylou Harris, Alison Krauss and Gillian Welch singing Down from the Mountain. "Didn't Leave Nobody But the Baby" on the O Brother, Where Art Thou? soundtrack." Zaino added, somewhat disapprovingly, that "Lorelai" is "a litany of women the narrator has been with, plus their deficiencies. (Mary Claire's is especially disturbing.)" Grant Ziegler wrote of a March, 2013 concert, "'Lorelei' disgusted and amused the audience, as the lyrics were all about Lynch's ex-girlfriends who had one sort of deformity or another."

"Tennessee" 
When Lynch started writing the tune, the song was going to be about Michigan. "It's just Tennessee is easier to rhyme, (A). And (B), it was in the news at the time I started writing the song for a lot of really weird, backwards ideas that were coming out of Tennessee," he told interviewer John Liberty. Lynch said that, on stage, the song has "been one of the highlights".

Reviewer Zaino wrote that "Tennessee" is "a predictable broadside against meth-cooking hillbillies..." Ziegler called the song "beautiful, but offensive" and added, "it's also where Jaye is from. Jaye, who looks and sounds way too innocent to be on this tour, was a good sport about the song and the constant ribbing from the band."

"Let Me Inside" 
Zaino writes that "Let Me Inside" "plays against more crude expectations" (that is, it's not as shocking as a Lynch fan might expect, given that the lyrics suggest the narrator is an emotionally distraught stalker). Reviewer Matthew Fugere's opinion was that "trying to convince someone to let you inside a house ... sounds the most mundane, but "Let Me Inside" is actually one of the funniest songs on Lion."

"The Night I Laid You Down" 
Piet Levy of the Milwaukee Journal Sentinel wrote, "The best song on the album is the most subtle: a tender duet called "The Night I Laid You Down" that slowly unravels to become a lovers' quarrel over the music that was playing on the night in question." Nick Zaino wrote, similarly, "Credit some of Lynch's cohorts for helping create a lush musical backdrop. Courtney Jaye sings backup and the occasional duet, and her voice is gorgeous on "The Night I Laid You Down," a musical argument over what song was playing the first time a couple made love. It's pretty and playful, and in the post-song banter, there's a clear feeling of "What the hell am I doing here?" in Jaye's voice. Lynch seems to relish making her swear or sing something off-color, contrasting with the purity of her voice. It's especially effective on the live disc."

"Too Jesusy" 
John Liberty wrote that the song is "about a woman whose spirituality gets in the way of a relationship. Lynch said it's not an indictment of people who believe in Jesus, but rather commentary on people 'who decide that what they believe in is what everyone should believe in'." "You don't need to shove it down my throat," Lynch said.

(Lynch is the son of a former priest and a former nun, and has written other songs which critique or spoof religious themes, such as "Priest", "Craig" and "Beelz".)

"You'll Do" 
Reviewer Fugere thought that the song "takes the rather unoriginal concept of the desperation that can be found during a bar's closing time and adds a few funny lines to it. It's not a terrible song, but it really does not fit in with the rest of the album."

Singles
The only single released from the album was "Tattoo".

Track listing
All songs by Stephen Lynch.

Side A
"Tattoo" – 4:19
"No Meat" – 4:13
"So This Is Outer Space?" – 4:55
"Lorelei" – 4:56
"Lion" – 4:09
"Tennessee" – 5:09
"Let Me Inside" – 3:27
"The Night I Laid You Down" – 5:20
"Too Jesusy" – 3:20
"The Gathering" – 3:30
"You'll Do" – 4:16
"Whiskey Disk" – 5:04
"Hey Love" – 4:15

Side B
"Lorelei" (Live) – 5:52
"Tattoo" (Live) – 5:49
"Let Me Inside" (Live) – 4:03
"The Night I Laid You Down" (Live) – 5:04
"Too Jesusy" (Live) – 5:00
"No Meat" (Live) – 6:45
"So This Is Outer Space?" (Live) – 6:17
"Hey Love" (Live) – 6:34
"Whiskey Dick" (Live) – 6:43
"The Gathering" (Live) – 4:28
"You'll Do" (Live) – 4:55
"Tennessee" (Live) – 5:33
"Lion" (Live) – 4:00

Credits
Stephen Lynch – Composer, Fender Rhodes, Guitar, Guitar (Acoustic), Piano, Primary Artist, Producer, Vocals
Rod Cone – Vocals, Vocals (Background)
Courtney Jaye – Vocals
David Josefsberg – Vocals
Charlie King – Banjo, Dobro, Harmonica, Lap Steel Guitar, Mandolin, Vocals, Vocals (Background)
David Below – Drums, Percussion, Vocals (Background)
Ivan Bodley – Bass
Rich Campbell – Piano
Tom Capek – Mastering
Frank Cicero – Photography
John Deadrick – Organ, Piano
Erin Dwight – Cover Art (Dwight is Lynch's wife)
Sarah Hall – Public Relations
David Henry – Cello
Scott Hull – Mastering
Doug Lancio – Baritone, Engineer, Guitar (Electric), Mixing, Percussion, Producer
Jon Lurie – Audio Technician
Tim Marks – Bass
Nick Newberry – Assistant Engineer, Fender Rhodes
Brad Pimberton – Drums
Jillian Reitsma – Layout
Steven Remote – Location Recording Engineer
Peter Sachon – Cello
Dean Sharenow – Engineer, Mixing, Producer
Amanda Stevens – Photography
Felix Toro – Audio Technician

Reception 
In late 2012, Lion debuted at No. 1 on iTunes and Amazon.com.

Reggie Edwards of The Front Row Report gave the album a rating of 8.5 out of 10, saying, "The entire album has a softer, more camp-firey feel to it; almost a folksy feel... When you factor that in with the off-the-wall lyrics of hilarity that ensue from Lynch, this is a home run."

Tyler Maas, reviewing a tour concert just a few days after the album's release, declared, "Stephen Lynch is a modern day renaissance man. The accomplished stand-up comic, and Tony Award-nominated actor also fancies himself a musician more than anything else... Lynch and a skilled cast of accompanying talent treated a jam-packed crowd to an evening of explicit entertainment that combined great music, a treasure trove of crude humor and even a bit of prepared stage-patter to tie it all together." Maas praised Lynch's "undeniable vocal range, his unique song topics and stage presence throughout" and summed up: "While too raunchy to be taken seriously as a musician, and too musical to earn respect from some of his comedic brethren, Lynch's knack for both mediums puts him in a class all his own."

Reviewer Nick Zaino wrote that "there are songs on Lion that are so enchanting it would be easy to lose the words. Frequently funny songs are arranged and/or mixed to keep the music from distracting from the joke." In conclusion, Zaino said, "And of course the whole enterprise is helped by the between-song patter. Rarely has something so beautiful been so apt to also make you giggle like an idiot."
 
Piet Levy of the Milwaukee Journal Sentinel wrote, "He primarily writes and performs pretty singer-songwriter gems that recall Death Cab for Cutie's Ben Gibbard. Tracks like "Tattoo" and "Tennessee" are more mean-spirited than funny, although they elicit laughs when the target suddenly becomes Lynch's own songwriting shortcomings. There's plenty of profanity here, but because Lynch sings with the sensitivity of a poet, it minimizes the shock value and wink-wink showboating Lion could have easily become."

In a four-star review, Chuck Campbell of the Knoxville News Sentinel wrote, "He's still largely regarded as a comic who sings and plays guitar, but his new Lion shows expanded commitment and growth in the musical arena for Lynch, who recorded the release in Nashville with a full roster of supporting talent. The result is a folkie, Americana sound that could easily stand apart from the droll lyrics as it breezes along with the likes of piano, banjo, mandolin, organ, cello and occasional dueting vocals from Courtney Jaye."

Matthew Fugere of the website The Comic's Comic wrote, "From a musical stance, Lion moves far past Lynch's previous albums. He really nails a specific genre and style that works with the entire album." Fugere found fault with a few songs and said that "Lion falls short of being Lynch's funniest album, but it's still a great addition to an already hilarious discography..." The review praises "Let Me Inside" as "one of the funniest songs" on a "well produced and very polished" album.

Charts

Weekly charts

Year-end charts

References

Stephen Lynch (musician) albums
2012 albums
2010s comedy albums